Andrea Giacomini (born 4 April 1987) is an Italian footballer who plays as a midfielder.

Biography
Born in Ciampino, The Province of Rome, Giacomini started his career at A.S. Roma and signed a contract until 30 June 2010. After graduating from Primavera Team, he was loaned to Serie B side Vicenza and Serie C1 side Ternana. In 2008–09 season, he left for Gallipoli where he won the Lega Pro Prima Divisione champion.

In July 2009, he joined Rimini in a co-ownership deal.

On 9 June 2014 he was signed by Salernitana . However, on 1 September he was released. On 7 September he was about to sign for L'Aquila. However, he joined Matera on 14 October instead.

He capped for Italy at 2004 UEFA European Under-17 Football Championship qualification.

Honours
Gallipoli
Lega Pro Prima Divisione: 2009

References

External links
 Profile at Rimini 
 Profile at FIGC 
 Profile at AIC.Football.it 

Italian footballers
Italy youth international footballers
Serie B players
Serie C players
A.S. Roma players
L.R. Vicenza players
Ternana Calcio players
A.S.D. Gallipoli Football 1909 players
Rimini F.C. 1912 players
Latina Calcio 1932 players
Ascoli Calcio 1898 F.C. players
U.S. Salernitana 1919 players
Association football midfielders
Sportspeople from the Metropolitan City of Rome Capital
1987 births
Living people
Footballers from Lazio